F/X: The Series is a television series based on the film F/X, starring Cameron Daddo, Christina Cox, Kevin Dobson (season 1), Jacqueline Torres (season 2), Carrie-Anne Moss and Jason Blicker. It ran for 40 episodes from 1996 through 1998.

Much or all of the show was filmed in Toronto, Ontario, Canada (save for stock footage to make it appear to be New York City). The opening sequence ended with a television crew in the foreground loading trucks, and an enormous advertisement (painted on the rear of a building) for The Phantom of the Opera, of which a theatrical production was showing in Toronto at the time.

Premise 
The show focuses on Rollie Tyler (Cameron Daddo), a special effects man in NYC, who assists NYPD detective Leo McCarthy (Kevin Dobson) in capturing criminals. In the second season, Dobson's character was killed and replaced with Mira Sanchez (Jacqueline Torres).

Cast
Cameron Daddo as Rollie Tyler, a special effects expert who moonlights as a forensic investigator and expert for the NYPD.
Kevin Dobson as Det. Leo McCarthy (season 1), a veteran NYPD officer and Tyler's handler until his untimely murder.
Christina Cox as Angie Ramirez, Tyler's friend and co-worker.
Richard Waugh as Det. Francis Gatti, McCarthy's partner.
Jason Blicker as Capt. Marvin Van Duren, the NYPD commander overseeing all of Tyler's cases.
Carrie-Anne Moss as Lucinda "Luce" Scott (season 1), a struggling actress brought in by Tyler to act as a ringer or body double when needed.
Jacqueline Torres as Mira Sanchez (season 2), the NYPD officer who replaces McCarthy as Tyler's police handler.
Sherry Miller as Colleen O'Malley (season 1)

Episodes

Season 1 (1996–97)

Season 2 (1997–98)

DVD releases 
Alliance Home Entertainment has released the entire series on DVD in Region 1 (Canada only).

In Region 2, Cinema Club released the first season on DVD in the UK on March 27, 2006.

References

External links 

 
 

Live action television shows based on films
Television series by CBS Studios
Television shows filmed in Toronto
1990s Canadian drama television series
1996 Canadian television series debuts
1998 Canadian television series endings
CBS original programming